This is a list of awards and nominations received by AKMU, a South Korean duo who participated on K-pop Star 2 in 2012 and debuted under YG Entertainment in 2014 after they won the second installment of the K-pop Star series.


Awards and nominations

Other accolades

Listicles

References

External links 

 

Akdong Musician